George Asprey (born 1 October 1966) is a British stage, film, and television character actor. Since 2008, Asprey has played the part of Scar in the West End theatre production of the musical The Lion King.

Early life
Of Asprey's origins, the Daily Mirror said that his world had been one of "indecent wealth" and he was not born with a silver spoon in his mouth but a "silver shovel". The only son of Edward Asprey, of Asprey the jewellers, he was educated at Charterhouse School and was expected to join the family business on leaving school. Asprey rebelled, wishing instead to pursue an acting career. This was not welcomed by his father, and the pair did not speak for several months. Asprey subsequently studied business in the United States, with a view to joining the family firm, but while there was cast in a stage production of The Tempest. This led him to audition for entry to the London Academy of Music and Dramatic Art (LAMDA), and at the age of twenty he was one of nineteen new students accepted out of some 2,500 applicants.

Career
Soon after leaving LAMDA, Asprey was cast as Sean Devereux in the television film The Dying of the Light (Yorkshire Television, 1992). His character was a UNICEF aid worker who was murdered, and Asprey received good reviews for the performance. He appeared as a policeman in Mary Shelley's Frankenstein (1994).

In 1995, Asprey was cast as Tony Patterson, a promiscuous hairdresser, in the ITV television serial An Independent Man. In 2003 he played Doc Holliday in a BBC production, in 2016 appeared as Walter Monckton in The Crown, and in 2021 played Jonathon Rees QC in Four Lives.

Asprey's longest-running part on stage is as Scar in the West End production of The Lion King, which he began to play in 2008 and was still performing in October 2019, when in an interview he described Scar as "probably the greatest baddie that Disney has ever written". The production had to close in March 2020 due to the COVID-19 lockdown, but it reopened at the Lyceum Theatre in July 2021, with Asprey returning as Scar.

Personal life
In 1992, while they were both appearing in The Sound of Music, Asprey dated Amanda Holden.

Asprey and his wife Kirsten have three daughters.

Filmography

Film
 The Dying of the Light (TV movie, 1992) as Sean Devereux
Mary Shelley's Frankenstein (1994) as Policeman 
Secrets & Lines (2000) as Andrew
AKA (2002) as David, Lord Glendening
Out of Bounds (2003) as Matthew Van Huet
The Wedding Date (2005) as Pat
Ian Fleming: Bondmaker (2005) as Officer
 The Greatest Game Ever Played (2005) as Wilfred Reid
Riot at the Rite (2005) as Voucher, journalist
The Gentlemen (2019) as Lord Snowball
Without Remorse (2021) as Denis Stewart

Television
A Breed of Heroes (BBC, 1994) as Second Lieutenant
 An Independent Man (1995) as Tony Patterson
 The Peter Principle (1995) as Frank
Supply and Demand (1997) as Barry Guard
 Coming Home (1998) as Dr Jeremy Wells
Trial & Retribution (1998) as DC Jack Hutchens
The Bill (1998) as Andrew Stirling 
 Nancherrow (1999) as Dr Jeremy Wells
Holby City (2003) as Simon Hargreaves
 The Wild West: Gunfight at the OK Corral (BBC, 2003) as Doc Holliday
Mayo (2006) as Adam Hendrick
 Waking the Dead (2007) as Young Bruno Rivelli
Psychoville (2009) as John Haigh
Upstairs Downstairs (2010) as Oswald Mosley
The Crown (2016) as Walter Monckton
The Barking Murders (2021) as Jonathon Rees QC

Notes

External links
"George Asprey", IMDb
"George Asprey", London Theatre Direct
THE LION KING Education series: Episode 4 - An actor prepares, YouTube

1966 births
Alumni of the London Academy of Music and Dramatic Art
English male film actors
English male stage actors
English male television actors
Living people
People educated at Charterhouse School
20th-century English male actors
21st-century English male actors